Josefin Johansson (born 17 March 1988) is a Swedish football midfielder currently playing for Piteå IF in the Damallsvenskan.

References

External links
 Piteå player profile  
 

1988 births
Living people
Swedish women's footballers
Damallsvenskan players
Piteå IF (women) players
Women's association football midfielders
Sunnanå SK players
UEFA Women's Euro 2017 players